Watty Graham's Gaelic Athletic Club, Glen, is a Gaelic Athletic Association (GAA) club based outside Maghera in the south of County Londonderry in Northern Ireland. Players are drawn from Maghera and some surrounding townlands. The club competes in Gaelic football, ladies' Gaelic football and camogie.

Name
The club is named after Watty (Walter) Graham, who was a resident of Maghera in the 18th century. He was an educated Presbyterian who became an Elder of his church. Frustrated at the many restrictions on his liberty, he joined the United Irishmen. At the time of the 1798 rebellion he was captured and subsequently hanged in Maghera.

Camogie
Glen fields Camogie teams at U12, U14, U16, Minor and Senior levels. The senior team competes in the Credit Union Derry Premier League.

Ladies' football
Glen Ladies' football club was formed in 1995. The club has won the Derry Senior Ladies' Football Championship 11 times and currently have won nine in a row.

Watty Graham Park
The club's home ground is Watty Graham Park. It was opened in 1982 by then GAA President Paddy Buggy. The first game was an over-35s game, which was followed by an inter-county match between Derry and Armagh. Celtic Park in Derry City is officially recognised as Derry's main county ground, but Watty Graham Park has hosted a number of National League and Dr McKenna Cup games. Watty Graham Park currently has a capacity of six thousand.

History
The Watty Graham club evolved from the Pearse's club formed around 1933, when Fr Anthony Doherty, amongst others, arranged a South Derry league. The club reached the 1944 South Derry final and a few of their players represented Derry.

After the folding of the Pearse's club, Watty Graham's GAC, Glen, was officially formed in 1948. In the early 1950s, it competed in a number of South Derry Finals and in 1953 they defeated St John's, Mullan (a townland of Ballinderry), to win the South Derry Junior Championship. They won the same title six years later defeating The Loup in the final. 1959 also saw their first all county success defeating Faughanvale in the final.

In 1964, they won the South Derry Junior and Derry Junior Football Championship by beating Littlebridge (part of the modern day Ógra Colmcille club) and Sarfield's respectively. The side repeated this feat in 1966 by beating The Loup in the South Derry Junior final before going on to win the Derry Junior final. The 1970s proved a barren decade for Watty Graham's and they have little apart from a McGlinchey Cup success in 1974 to show for it. Glen opened a new social club in Maghera in April 1976.

The club won its first Derry Intermediate Football Championship in 1980. They overcame Drumsurn in the final by 0–06 to 0–03. Glen won a second Intermediate Championship in 1983 defeating Drum in the final.

In 1985, Watty Graham's won the All-Ireland Óg Sport title. They competed in county, provincial and All Ireland phases to come out winners. Two years later they won the Derry Minor Football Championship with a success over Ballinascreen. The same year Glen won the Larkin Cup and also the Senior Division 1 League. The side added another Larkin Cup in 1995. Glen won their fourth and fifth Junior Championship in 2004 and 2005, the competitions this time won by the Glen Thirds team. This same Thirds team went on to win three in a row by winning the Thirds Championship in 2006.

After a prolonged period of dominance in underage football, Glen won their fourth successive Ulster Minor Championship on 1 January 2015.

Glen's current manager is Malachy O'Rourke. In 2021, they won their first Derry Senior Football Championship; in 2022, they won the county championship again, and then added the Ulster Senior Football Championship after wins over Errigal Ciarán (Tyrone), Erin's Own, Cargin (Antrim), and Kilcoo (Down).

Football titles

Senior
 Ulster Senior Club Football Championship: 1
 2022
 Derry Senior Football Championship: 2
 2021, 2022
Derry Senior Football League: 2
1987, 2021
Derry Senior Reserve Football Trophy: 1
2008
Derry Intermediate Football Championship: 2
1980, 1983
Derry Intermediate Football League: 1
2014
Derry Junior Football Championship: 5
1959, 1964, 1966, 2004 (won by Glen Thirds team), 2005 (won by Glen Thirds team)
South Derry Junior Football Championship: 4
1953, 1959, 1964, 1966
Derry Thirds Football Championship: ?
2006
Larkin Cup 3
1987, 1995, 2005
McGlinchey Cup 1
1974
Derry Senior Football championship (division 1):21
1924–31
1945
1951–55
1979–84
1988–92

Under 21
 South Derry Under-21 Football Championship: 1
 2014
 Derry Under-21 Football Championship: 3
 2014, 2015, 2016
 Ulster Under-21 Football Championship: 3
 2014–15, 2015–16, 2016–17

Minor
Derry Minor Football Championship: 5
 1987, 2011, 2012, 2013, 2014
Ulster Minor Club Football Championship: 4
 2011, 2012, 2013, 2014
Derry Minor Football League: 3
 2011, 2012, 2013

Under 16

Derry Under-16 Football Championship:2
2010, 2011
Derry Under-16 Football League:1
 2011
South Derry Under-16 Football Championship: 1
1984
South Derry Under-16 'B' Football Championship: 1
2002, 2005
South Derry Under-16 'B' Football League: 2
2004, 2006

Under-15
All-Ireland Óg Sport: 1
1985
Ulster Óg Sport: 3
1985, 2009, 2010, 2012
Derry Óg Sport: 4
1985, 2009, 2010, 2012

Under-14
Ulster Féile na nÓg: 1
2009
Derry Féile na nÓg: 3
1994, 2008, 2011
Derry Under-14 Football Championship: 4
1984, 2008, 2009, 2010
Derry Under-14 Football League: 4
2008, 2009, 2010, 2011
South Derry Under-14 Football Championship: 1
1982
South Derry Under-14 'B' Football Championship: 2
1998, 2004
South Derry Under-14 'B' Football League: 1
1998

Under-13
 Derry Under-13 Football Championship: 3
 2008, 2009, 2010

Ladies' football titles
Derry Football Championship: 13
1996, 1997, 1999, 2000, 2001, 2002, 2003, 2004, 2005, 2006, 2007, 2012, 2016
Derry Football League: ?
1999, 2000, 2001
Ulster Intermediate Football Championship: 2
2003, 2007
All Ireland Intermediate Sevens: 1
2007
Powerscreen Sevens: 1
2000
Antrim 7-a-side Shield: 1
2002
Under-14 Derry Féile na nÓg: 2
2010, 2011

Note 1: The above lists may be incomplete. Please add any other honours you know of.
Note 2: Most of the Ladies' honours are only updated as far as 2002. Please add any other honours you know of.

Notable players
 Cathal Mullholland (c)
 Ciaran McFaul – Current Derry player
 Emmett Bradley
 Danny Tallon – Derry u-21 player
Enda Gormley – Two-time All Star winning Derry footballer. Part of Derry's 1993 All-Ireland Senior Football Championship winning side. Gormley managed Glen to their first ever Ulster Minor Championship at St Paul's Belfast on 1 January 2012, defeating Armagh Harps.
Damien McCusker – Goalkeeper in Derry's 1993 All-Ireland Senior Football Championship winning side.
Fergal McCusker – Part of Derry's 1993 All-Ireland Senior Football Championship winning side.
Séamus Lagan – Former Derry footballer. Won All-Ireland Minor and All-Ireland U-21 Championships. Also won Hogan Cup with St Columb's College, Derry.

See also
Derry Senior Football Championship
List of Gaelic games clubs in Derry

External links
Watty Grahams GACs website
 Glen Ladies' Gaelic football website

References

Gaelic games clubs in County Londonderry
Gaelic football clubs in County Londonderry
Gaelic Athletic Association clubs established in 1948
1948 establishments in Northern Ireland
Maghera, County Londonderry